Carlos Alcaraz defeated Diego Schwartzman in the final, 6–4, 6–2 to win the singles title at the 2022 Rio Open. Alcaraz became the youngest winner of an ATP Tour 500 event since the category was created in 2009.

Cristian Garín was the defending champion from when the event was last held in 2020,  but lost to Federico Coria in the first round.

Seeds
The top four seeds received a bye into the second round.

Draw

Finals

Top half

Bottom half

Qualifying

Seeds

Qualifiers

Lucky loser

Qualifying draw

First qualifier

Second qualifier

Third qualifier

Fourth qualifier

References

External links
 Main draw
 Qualifying draw

Rio Open - Singles
Rio Open
Rio Open